The Oratory of San Spiridione is a small Baroque-style church or chapel located on Via Nuova in the historic center of Reggio Emilia, region of Emilia Romagna, Italy.

History and Description 
The year engraved over the portal dates construction of its facade to 1759. The interior during the next decade, was frescoed with stunning quadratura and roof panels by Francesco Vellani and Benedetti. The frescoes in the apse depict an assumption of the Virgin. At the three altars near the apse are canvases depicting St Joseph and St John the Baptist (left); San Spiridione (center), and The Death of Sant'Andrea Avellino (right).

References

Bibliography 
 
 
 

Roman Catholic churches in Reggio Emilia
18th-century Roman Catholic church buildings in Italy
Baroque architecture in Reggio Emilia